The GTM K3 or Rossa K3 is a Metro based 2 kit car by GTM Cars

The car was based on two front Rover Metro subframes, with the steering being locked on the rear subframe, these were fitted to a fibreglass monocoque tub. Coupé or convertible bodywork could be specified.

References

External links
Official GTMOC Forum

Kit cars
K3